William Henry Golding (14 April 1878 – 31 December 1961) was a Liberal party member of the House of Commons of Canada. He was born in Hibbert Township, Ontario and became a machinist by career.

In 1916, Golding became a municipal councillor in Seaforth, Ontario and continued in that role until he became the town's mayor in 1921. He remained mayor until 1929.

He was first elected to Parliament at the Huron South riding in a by-election on 3 October 1932, then re-elected there in the 1935 federal election. With electoral district changes, he was re-elected at Huron—Perth in 1940 and 1945. He left the House of Commons in June 1949 when he was appointed to the Senate. He remained a Senator until his death on 31 December 1961.

References

External links
 

1878 births
1961 deaths
Canadian senators from Ontario
Liberal Party of Canada MPs
Liberal Party of Canada senators
Mayors of places in Ontario
Members of the House of Commons of Canada from Ontario
Ontario municipal councillors